Finney House may refer to:

Dr. Frank Finney House, La Junta, Colorado, listed on the National Register of Historic Places (NRHP)
Wilson-Finney-Land House, Madison, Georgia, listed on the NRHP in Morgan County, Georgia
Joseph Finney House, Bloomingdale, Indiana, listed on the NRHP in Parke County, Indiana
Hite-Finney House, Martinsville, Indiana, NRHP-listed
Warren Wesley Finney House, Emporia, Kansas, listed on the NRHP in Lyon County, Kansas
Finney Houses Historic District, Churchville, Maryland, NRHP-listed
Finney House (Nevada City, Montana), listed on the NRHP in Madison County, Montana
Finney-Darrah House, Martin's Ferry, Ohio, listed on the NRHP in Ohio
Prewitt-Amis-Finney House, Culleoka, Tennessee, listed on the NRHP in Tennessee 
Wofford-Finney House, Cuero, Texas, listed on the NRHP in Texas
Finney-Lee House, Snow Creek, Virginia, NRHP-listed